The 1901 Rutgers Queensmen football team was an American football team that represented Rutgers University as an independent during the 1901 college football season. In its first and only season under head coach Arthur P. Robinson, the team compiled a 0–7 record and was outscored by their opponents, 133 to 5. William B. Wyckoff was the team captain.

Schedule

References

Rutgers
Rutgers Scarlet Knights football seasons
College football winless seasons
Rutgers Queensmen football